A Japanese Idyll is a 1912 silent short drama film directed by and starring Lois Weber. The film was produced by the Rex Motion Picture Company for release by Universal Film Manufacturing Company.

The film is preserved at the Library of Congress.

Cast
Lois Weber

References

External links
A Japanese Idyll at IMDb.com

1912 films
American silent short films
Films directed by Lois Weber
Universal Pictures short films
American black-and-white films
1912 short films
1912 drama films
Silent American drama films
1910s American films